Gamil Ratib (18 August 1926 – 19 September 2018) was an Egyptian actor. He appeared in television and film productions and briefly in theater over a 65-year career. He was known for numerous villainous roles and his appearance in the English-language epic historical drama film Lawrence of Arabia.

Biography
Born in 1926 in Cairo to an Egyptian family known of their love for arts, Ratib was sent to study arts in Paris. His love of performance came from French theatre, which he studied at the University of France, before making his film debut in 1945. He was a much-awarded actor in both his native Egypt and in France, having worked in both countries, including being given the Legion of Honour. In France, Ratib married a French woman and was given French citizenship.

Filmography

1947: Les Amants du pont Saint-Jean as Un jeune homme au bal (uncredited)
1956: Trapeze as Stefan
1957: O.S.S. 117 n'est pas mort
1957: L'Aventurière des Champs-Élysées as Christian Forestier
1961: Deuxième Bureau contre terroristes as Igorian
1962: Lawrence of Arabia (by David Lean) as Majid
1964: Shadow of Evil as Akhom
1964: Male Companion as Le maharadjah (uncredited)
1967: To Commit a Murder as Belloum
1967: Réseau secret as Ben Salem
1968: The Young Wolves as Prince Linzani
1973: L’Alphomega (TV Series, by Lazare Iglesis) as Prince Raheem Abdel Rasheem
1975: Al kaddab
1975: Ala mn notlik Al-Rosas -as Rushdy
1978: El-Soud ela al-hawia as Edmund
1978: Roadless Traveller
1979: Ualla azae lel sayedat -as Tarek
1979: Chafika et Metwal (by Aly Badrakhan) as Afandina
1980: Shaaban Taht El-Sifr as Abdel Gawad
1982: L'Étoile du Nord as Nemrod Lobetoum
1983: Hob Fi El-Zinzana as Sharnoubi
1984: Al-La'na as Helmy
1985: El Terella
1985: Genius Number Five
1985: Adieu Bonaparte (وداعا بونابرت, Wadaan Bonabart) (by Youssef Chahine) as Barthélémy
1985: Ali Bey Mazhar Wal 40 Haramy as Sarhan
1985: El-Keif as Selim El-Bahz
1985: Sanawat al khatar
1986: The Innocent as Dr. Ali Khalefa
1986: Al-Bidaya 
1986: Alaqzam Kademon
1987: Kaher el-zaman as Dr. Halim
1988: Al-Darga Al-Thalitha (by Sherif Arafa)
1990: The Serpent of Death as Omar
1991: Poussière de diamant as Si Abbes
1992: La dame du Caire
1993: La Fortune de Gaspard (TV Movie by Gérard Blain) as Féréor
1995: Checkmate Mr. President! as president
1995: Toyour elzalam - Roshdy
1995: Jusqu'au bout de la nuit (by Gérard Blain) as Rousseau
1996: Un été à La Goulette (by Férid Boughedir) as Hadj Beji
1996: Afarit el-asphalt
1996: Méfie-toi de l'eau qui dort
1997: La Nuit du Destin (by Abdelkrim Bahloul) as M. Slimani
1998: Gamal Abd El Naser
2000: Stand-by as Le médecin
2001: El-Rehla as Ez bec
2001: Al-saher
2005: Zaïna, cavalière de l'Atlas as Récitant / Narrator (voice)
2007: Alawela fel Gharam
2008: The Aquarium as Youssef's Father
2008: Laylat El-Baby Doll as  Sgt. Peter
2010: Turk's Head (by  Pascal Elbé) as Aram
2011: Cinématon or not Cinématon as himself
2011: Carnet de Dubai Hiver II : Errances aquatiques as himself
2011: Carnet de Dubai Hiver IV : L'Eau et le haut as himself
2012: Un nuage dans un verre d'eau as M. Noun
2018: Hier as Virgile (final film role)

Theatre
 1960 : Hamlet by William Shakespeare, production by Philippe Dauchez, Maurice Jacquemont, Théâtre des Champs-Elysées
 1967 : Scheherazade by Jules Supervielle, production by Jean Rougerie, Théâtre des Mathurins

Honours
 : Grand Cross of the Order of Merit
 :  Knight of the Legion of Honour
 : Grand Officier of the National Order of Merit of Tunisia

References

External links

1926 births
2018 deaths
Male actors from Cairo
Egyptian male film actors
Egyptian male stage actors
Chevaliers of the Légion d'honneur
Naturalized citizens of France
French people of Egyptian descent